Peter Dennis Elliott  (born ) is a New Zealand actor. He has appeared in numerous television shows including Shortland Street, Gloss and Homeward Bound. He has also appeared in several movies including Heavenly Creatures. He has a daughter Lucy Elliott who is an actress, who played character Dayna Jenkins on Shortland Street from 2013 to 2016.

Early life
Elliott was born in the Christchurch suburb of Upper Riccarton, and was educated at Linwood High School. He was involved in amateur dramatics in Christchurch, and found work in set construction for television when he was 22. He joined the Court Theatre in Christchurch in 1980, aged 23.

Shortland Street
Elliott played a pivotal role as Dr David Kearney, clinic director. In this era of Shortland Street, storylines were externally driven, with challenges and topical events emanating from Central (Hospital), the Ministry (of Health), and the wider community.

Along with key characters Rachel McKenna and Dr Chris Warner, the character of Dr David Kearney formed the key anchors of the show.

Get Ready, Get Thru campaign
Elliott also fronts the Get Ready, Get Thru campaign for NZ Civil Defence. This is a highly visible campaign on national TV, for which he was chosen to be a respected and well-known figure.

Other work
Becoming widely known first on 1980s soap Gloss, Elliott was nominated for 'Best Actor' playing the scheming character Rex Redfern. Gloss was a seminal NZ drama/ soap opera, one of the first local productions to achieve NZ-wide fame & audience. In 1987 he appeared in the TVNZ mini-series Erebus: The Aftermath.

Winning a Qantas award for 2009 telemovie Until Proven Innocent, he was also nominated Best Presenter at the TV Guide Television Awards 2002 for Captain's Log. He has appeared in a number of films.

Elliott also has a strong & long-standing career on stage, performing for over 23 years. He covers the range from Shakespeare to pantomime, and works frequently with notable directors such as Simon Prast.

He was also the corporate voice for New Zealand's leading talk radio station Newstalk ZB up until 2011.

In the 2021 New Years Honours, Elliott was appointed an Officer of the New Zealand Order of Merit, for services to the performing arts and baseball.

References

External links

Peter Elliott at NZ On Screen
Peter Elliott's website and showreel

1950s births
Living people
People from Christchurch
People educated at Linwood College
New Zealand male television actors
New Zealand television presenters
Year of birth missing (living people)
New Zealand male soap opera actors
20th-century New Zealand male actors
21st-century New Zealand male actors
Officers of the New Zealand Order of Merit